David Rodríguez Ramos (born 26 June 2000) is a Spanish footballer who plays for CD Tenerife B. Mainly a right back, he can also play as a central defender or a defensive midfielder.

Club career
Born in Santa Cruz de Tenerife, Canary Islands, Rodríguez was a CD Tenerife youth graduate, and made his senior debut with the C-team in the 2019–20 season, in the regional leagues. He first appeared with the reserves on 20 October 2019, starting in a 1–0 Tercera División home win over UD Villa de Santa Brígida.

Rodríguez made his first team debut on 10 October 2021, coming on as a first-half substitute for Álex Bermejo in a 2–1 home defeat of SD Amorebieta in the Segunda División championship.

References

External links
Tenerife profile 

2000 births
Living people
Footballers from Santa Cruz de Tenerife
Spanish footballers
Association football defenders
Segunda División players
Tercera División players
Tercera Federación players
Divisiones Regionales de Fútbol players
CD Tenerife B players
CD Tenerife players